Golden Horn is an  mountain summit located in Okanogan County in Washington state. It is part of the Okanogan Range which is a sub-range of the North Cascades Range. Golden Horn is situated north of Methow Pass at headwaters of the Methow River, on land administered by the Okanogan–Wenatchee National Forest. It ranks as the 95th-highest summit in Washington. The nearest higher peak is Tower Mountain,  to the southeast. The first ascent of Golden Horn was made by Fred Beckey, Keith Rankin, and Charles Welsh on September 18, 1946.

Climate
Golden Horn is located in the marine west coast climate zone of western North America. Most weather fronts originate in the Pacific Ocean, and travel northeast toward the Cascade Mountains. As fronts approach the North Cascades, they are forced upward by the peaks of the Cascade Range, causing them to drop their moisture in the form of rain or snowfall onto the Cascades (Orographic lift). As a result, the west side of the North Cascades experiences high precipitation, especially during the winter months in the form of snowfall. During winter months, weather is usually cloudy, but, due to high pressure systems over the Pacific Ocean that intensify during summer months, there is often little or no cloud cover during the summer. Because of maritime influence, snow tends to be wet and heavy, resulting in high avalanche danger.

Geology
The North Cascades features some of the most rugged topography in the Cascade Range with craggy peaks, ridges, and deep glacial valleys. Geological events occurring many years ago created the diverse topography and drastic elevation changes over the Cascade Range leading to various climate differences.

The history of the formation of the Cascade Mountains dates back millions of years ago to the late Eocene Epoch. With the North American Plate overriding the Pacific Plate, episodes of volcanic igneous activity persisted.  In addition, small fragments of the oceanic and continental lithosphere called terranes created the North Cascades about 50 million years ago. Like many of the peaks of the Washington Pass area, Golden Horn is carved from Rapakivi texture granite of the Golden Horn batholith.

During the Pleistocene period dating back over two million years ago, glaciation advancing and retreating repeatedly scoured the landscape leaving deposits of rock debris. The "U"-shaped cross section of the river valleys are a result of recent glaciation. Uplift and faulting in combination with glaciation have been the dominant processes which have created the tall peaks and deep valleys of the North Cascades area.

See also

 Geography of the North Cascades
 Geology of the Pacific Northwest

References

External links
 Golden Horn aerial photo: Pbase.com
 Golden Horn weather: Mountain Forecast

North Cascades
Mountains of Washington (state)
Mountains of Okanogan County, Washington
North Cascades of Washington (state)
Cascade Range
North American 2000 m summits